Alphaville: une étrange aventure de Lemmy Caution (Alphaville: A Strange Adventure of Lemmy Caution) is a 1965 French New Wave science fiction neo-noir film directed by Jean-Luc Godard. It stars Eddie Constantine, Anna Karina, Howard Vernon and Akim Tamiroff. The film won the Golden Bear award of the 15th Berlin International Film Festival in 1965.

Alphaville combines the genres of dystopian science fiction and film noir. There are no special props or futuristic sets; instead, the film was shot in real locations in Paris, the night-time streets of the capital becoming the streets of Alphaville, while modernist glass and concrete buildings (which in 1965 were new and strange architectural designs) represent the city's interiors. The film is set in the future but the characters also refer to twentieth-century events; for example, the hero describes himself as a Guadalcanal veteran.

Expatriate American actor Eddie Constantine plays Lemmy Caution, a trenchcoat-wearing secret agent. Constantine had already played this or similar roles in dozens of previous films; the character was originally created by British crime novelist Peter Cheyney. However, in Alphaville, director Jean-Luc Godard moves Caution away from his usual twentieth-century setting and places him in a futuristic sci-fi dystopia, the technocratic dictatorship of Alphaville.

Plot
Lemmy Caution is a secret agent with the code number of 003 from "the Outlands". Entering Alphaville in his Ford Galaxie, he poses as a journalist named Ivan Johnson and claims to work for the Figaro-Pravda. Caution is on a series of missions. First, he searches for the missing agent Henri Dickson (Akim Tamiroff); second, he is to capture or kill the creator of Alphaville, Professor von Braun (Howard Vernon); lastly, he aims to destroy Alphaville and its dictatorial computer, Alpha 60. Alpha 60 is a sentient computer system created by von Braun, which is in complete control of all of Alphaville.

Alpha 60 has outlawed free thought and individualist concepts like love, poetry, and emotion in the city, replacing them with contradictory concepts or eliminating them altogether. One of Alpha 60's dictates is that "people should not ask 'why', but only say 'because". People who show signs of emotion are presumed to be acting illogically and are gathered, interrogated, and executed. In an image reminiscent of George Orwell's concept of Newspeak, there is a dictionary in every hotel room that is continuously updated when words that are deemed to evoke emotion become banned. As a result, Alphaville is an inhuman, alienated society.

Images of the E = mc2 and E = hν (the iconic equations of, respectively, special relativity and quantum mechanics, the two great scientific developments of the first half of the 20th century) are displayed several times to refer to the scientism that underpins Alphaville. At one point, Caution passes through a place called the Grand Omega Minus, from where brainwashed people are sent out to the other "galaxies" to start strikes, revolutions, family rows, and student revolts.

As an archetypal American antihero private eye in trenchcoat and with weathered visage, Lemmy Caution's old-fashioned machismo conflicts with the puritanical computer (Godard originally wanted to title the film Tarzan versus IBM). The opposition of his role to logic (and that of other dissidents to the regime) is represented by faux quotations from Capitale de la douleur ("Capital of Pain"), a book of poems by Paul Éluard.

Caution meets Dickson, who soon dies in the process of making love to a "Seductress Third Class". Caution then enlists the assistance of Natacha von Braun (Anna Karina), a programmer of Alpha 60 and daughter of Professor von Braun. Natacha is a citizen of Alphaville and, when questioned, says that she does not know the meaning of "love" or "conscience". Caution falls in love with her, and his love introduces emotion and unpredictability into the city. Natacha discovers, with the help of Lemmy Caution, that she was actually born outside Alphaville. (The city name is given as Nueva York—Spanish for New York—instead of either the original English name or the French literal rendering "Nouvelle-York".)

Professor von Braun (the name is a reference to the German rocket scientist Wernher von Braun) was originally known as Leonard Nosferatu (a tribute to F. W. Murnau's film Nosferatu), but Caution is repeatedly told that Nosferatu no longer exists. The Professor himself talks infrequently, referring only vaguely to his hatred for journalists, and offering Caution the chance to join Alphaville, even going so far as to offer him the opportunity to rule a galaxy. When he refuses Caution's offer to go back to "the outlands", Caution kills him.

Alpha 60 converses with Lemmy Caution several times, and its voice is seemingly ever-present in the city, serving as a sort of narrator. Caution eventually destroys or incapacitates it by telling it a riddle that involves something that Alpha 60 can not comprehend: poetry (although many of Alpha 60's lines are actually quotations from the Argentine poet Jorge Luis Borges, and the film's opening line, along with others, is an extract from Borges's essay "Forms of a Legend", and Alpha 60 makes other references to Borges's "A New Refutation of Time"). The concept of the individual self has been lost to the collectivized citizens of Alphaville, and this is the key to Caution's riddle.

At the end, Natacha realizes that it is her understanding of herself as an individual with desires that saves her and destroys Alpha 60. The film ends with her line "Je vous aime" ("I love you").

Cast

 Eddie Constantine as Lemmy Caution
 Anna Karina as Natacha von Braun
 Akim Tamiroff as Henri Dickson
 Christa Lang as 1st Seductress Third Class
 Valérie Boisgel as 2nd Seductress Third Class
 Jean-Louis Comolli as Professor Jeckell
 Michel Delahaye as Prof. von Braun's assistant
 Jean-André Fieschi as Professor Heckell
 Jean-Pierre Léaud as the Breakfast-waiter
 László Szabó as the Chief-engineer
 Howard Vernon as Professor von Braun/Leonard Nosferatu

Production

Despite its futuristic scenario, Alphaville was filmed entirely in and around Paris and no special sets or props were constructed. Buildings used were the Electricity Board building for the Alpha 60 computer centre and the Hotel Scribe.

Constantine came to the film through producer André Michelin, who had the actor under contract. Constantine had become a popular actor in France and Germany through his portrayal of tough-guy detective Lemmy Caution in a series of earlier films. Godard appropriated the character for Alphaville but according to director Anne Andreu, Godard's subversion of the Lemmy Caution "stereotype" effectively shattered Constantine's connection with the character—he reportedly said that he was shunned by producers after Alphaville was released. Constantine didn't play Lemmy Caution again until Panic Time in 1980.

The opening section of the film includes an unedited sequence that depicts Caution walking into his hotel, checking in, riding an elevator and being taken through various corridors to his room. According to cinematographer Raoul Coutard, he and Godard shot this section as a continuous four-minute take. Part of this sequence shows Caution riding an elevator up to his room, which was achieved thanks to the fact that the hotel used as the location had two glass-walled elevators side by side, allowing the camera operator to ride in one lift while filming Constantine riding the other car through the glass between the two. However, as Coutard recalled, this required multiple takes, since the elevators were old and in practice they proved very difficult to synchronize.

Like most of Godard's films, the performances and dialogue in Alphaville were substantially improvised. Assistant director Charles Bitsch recalled that, even when production commenced, he had no idea what Godard was planning to do. Godard's first act was to ask Bitsch to write a screenplay, saying that producer Michelin had been pestering him for a script because he needed it to help him raise finance from backers in Germany (where Constantine was popular). Bitsch protested that he had never read a Lemmy Caution book, but Godard simply said "Read one and then write it." Bitsch read a Caution book, then wrote a 30-page treatment and brought it to Godard, who said "OK, fine" and took it without even looking at it. It was then given to Michelin, who was pleased with the result, and the "script" was duly translated into German and sent off to the backers. In fact, none of it even reached the screen and according to Bitsch the German backers later asked Michelin to repay the money when they saw the completed film.

Influences on the film
Louis-Ferdinand Céline is directly referenced by Caution in the taxi, when he says "I am on a journey to the end of the night" (Voyage au bout de la nuit, 1932). Also, the use of poetry to combat Alpha 60 as a sentient being echoes the attitudes of Céline in a number of his works.
Henri Bergson is also referenced by Caution when being interrogated by Alpha 60, when he answers "the immediate data of consciousness " (Essai sur les données immédiates de la conscience, 1889) when asked his religion. Bergson's rejection of idealism in favour of felt experiences parallels Caution's conflict with the logical Alpha 60.
Another reference to French poetry is made by Caution when speaking to Alpha 60, saying that when it will solve his riddle it will become "[his] like, [his] brother," echoing the famous last line of Charles Baudelaire's To the Reader in Flowers of Evil.
Jean Cocteau exerted significant influence on Godard's films, and parallels between Alphaville and Cocteau's 1950 film Orpheus are evident. For example, Orphée's search for Cégeste and Caution's for Henri Dickson, between the poems Orphée hears on the radio and the aphoristic questions given by Alpha 60, between Orphée's victory over death through the recovery of his poetic powers and Caution's use of poetry to destroy Alpha 60. Godard also openly acknowledges his debt to Cocteau on several occasions. When Alpha 60 is destroyed, for instance, people stagger down labyrinthine corridors and cling to the walls like the inhabitants of Cocteau's Zone de la mort, and, at the end of the film, Caution tells Natacha not to look back. Godard compares this scene with Orphée's warning to Eurydice, and it is also possible to detect a reference here to the biblical flight from Sodom.
The voice of Alpha 60 was performed by a man with a mechanical voice box replacing his cancer-damaged larynx. It is inspired by Dr. Mabuse's disembodied voice in the 1933 film The Testament of Dr Mabuse.

Legacy

 Episode 21 of season 1 of Star Trek: The Original Series, "The Return of the Archons", which originally aired on 9 February 1967, refers to Alphaville.
German synthpop band Alphaville took their name from the film.
The affluent suburb Alphaville, outside São Paulo, Brazil, is named after the film.
The cover of Robert Palmer's 1974 debut album Sneakin' Sally Through the Alley was inspired by Alphaville.
 Alphaville is mentioned in the first chapter of Salman Rushdie's The Satanic Verses.
 The music video for the 1993 song "Linger" by The Cranberries was shot in grayscale and is a tribute/recreation of scenes from Alphaville.
The film production company Alphaville Pictures was co-founded in 2003 by Danish director Christoffer Boe, and was named after the film.
Haruki Murakami's 2004 novel After Dark features a love hotel named after the film. The book is also set entirely at night and the narrative voice often takes the shape of a camera.
The music video for the 2005 Kelly Osbourne song "One Word" is an homage to Alphaville. It was filmed in black and white and restages multiple sequences from the film, including many specific shots, and also recreates many of the film's distinctive costumes, sets and locations.
Jazz bassist and composer William Parker's 2007 album Alphaville Suite is inspired by and named after the film.
 The 2009 song "Your Pretty Sphinx Voice" by The Sour Notes includes sampled passages from Paul Éluard's "Capitale de la Douleur", as recited in the film.
Bryan Ferry's 2010 album Olympia includes a track titled "Alphaville", which takes its name from this film.
 Swedish alternative rock band Alpha 60 is named after the computer from the film.
 The name of a Finnish movie production company Villealfa comes from the movie. Also, the name of Aki Kaurismäki's character in an early Mika Kaurismäki movie The Liar is Ville Alfa.
 New York-based experimental metal band Imperial Triumphant's 2020 album is named Alphaville.

Reception

On review aggregator website Rotten Tomatoes, Alphaville received an approval rating of 91% based on 46 reviews, and an average rating of 8.36/10. Its consensus reads, "While Alphaville is by no means a conventional sci-fi film, Jean-Luc Godard creates a witty, noir-ish future all his own." Time Out London gave the film a positive review, calling it "a dazzling amalgam of film noir and science fiction".

See also
 List of French language films

Notes

References

External links
 
 
 
 The City of Pain - Alphaville
 Alphaville an essay by Andrew Sarris at the Criterion Collection

1960s dystopian films
1960s science fiction films
1960s spy films
1965 films
Films about computing
French avant-garde and experimental films
French black-and-white films
French neo-noir films
French science fiction drama films
French spy films
Films directed by Jean-Luc Godard
Films shot in Paris
1960s French-language films
Golden Bear winners
1960s French films